Pandit Shri krishan Sharma  is an Indian musician. He hails from a family of musicians. His initial training in music came from the "Guru Shishya Parampara" from his father, Pandit Gopal Krishan Sharma the foremost Vichitra Veena maestro.
He has given concerts in places such as Delhi, Kolkata, Gwalior, Chennai, Jaipur, Bhopal, Maihar, Lucknow, Banaras, Indore, Pune, Agra, Goa and Shimla. He performed in America, Mauritius, Réunion and the Netherlands.

Prominent in his recital is Gayaki Ang, with imaginative Alap, Jod Jhala, Gatkari and Layakari, in which he excels.
He featured in programmes broadcast by All India Radio and on television for over three decades. He is a Top Rank artist of All India Radio.
He introduced techniques in his repertoire by redirecting a basically Western instrument to perform Indian Classical Music.

See also 
 Music of India

References

External links 

 
 
 
 
 
 
 

Living people
1959 births
Indian guitarists
Hindustani instrumentalists
Slide guitarists
Vichitra veena players
Indian male classical musicians
All India Radio people